The Alpine Club was founded in London in 1857 and is the world's first mountaineering club. The primary focus of the club is to support mountaineers who climb in the Alps and the Greater Ranges of the world's mountains.

History

The Alpine Club was founded on 22 December 1857 by a group of British mountaineers at Ashley's Hotel in London. The original founders were active mountaineers in the Alps and instrumental in the development of alpine mountaineering during the Golden Age of Alpinism (1854–1865). E. S. Kennedy was the first chairman of the Alpine Club but the naturalist, John Ball, was the first president. Kennedy, also the first vice-president, succeeded him as president of the club from 1860 to 1863. In 1863, the club moved its headquarters to the Metropole Hotel.

The Alpine Club is specifically known for having developed early mountaineering-specific gear including a new type of rope. The goal was to engineer a strong and light rope that could be carried easily. A committee of the club tested samples from suppliers and prepared a specification in the early 1900s. The official Alpine Club Rope was then made by John Buckingham of Bloomsbury.  It was made from three strands of manila hemp, treated to be rot proof and marked with a red thread of worsted yarn.  
 
The present Alpine Club members remain extremely active in the Alps and the Greater Ranges, as well as in mountain arts, literature and science.

For many years it had the characteristics of a London-based Gentlemen's club, including a certain imprecision in the qualification for membership (said to have been 'A reasonable number of respectable peaks'). Until 1974, the club was strictly for men only, but in 1975, within months of membership being opened to women, a merger with the Ladies' Alpine Club was agreed, and the Club thus gained about 150 new members. By the last quarter of the 20th century, the club had evolved into Britain's senior mountaineering club, with a clear qualification for membership, for both men and women, and an 'aspirant' grade for those working towards full membership. However, it still requires prospective members to be proposed and seconded by existing members.

The club's history has been documented by George Band in his book Summit: 150 Years of the Alpine Club, and its artists in The Artists of the Alpine Club by Peter Mallalieu.

Current activities
Though the club organizes some UK-based meets and indoor lectures, its primary focus has always tended towards mountaineering overseas. It is associated more with exploratory mountaineering than with purely technical climbing (the early club was once dismissed as doing very little climbing but "a lot of walking steeply uphill"). These higher technical standards were often to be found in offshoots such as the 'Alpine Climbing Group' (ACG), founded in 1952.

The club has produced a suite of guidebooks that cover some of the more popular Alpine mountaineering regions. It also holds extensive book and photo libraries as well as an archive of historical artefacts which are regularly lent out to exhibitions.

Its members' activities are recounted annually in the club's publication the Alpine Journal, the world's oldest mountaineering journal, and interim newsletters are produced during the year. The club continues to encourage and sponsor mountaineering expeditions through its membership and is specifically focused on connecting with younger mountaineers. It maintains an online "Himalayan Index" of articles about Himalayan mountaineering activities recorded in journals, magazines and books in its library.

Presidents

1858–1860: John Ball
1861–1863: E. S. Kennedy
1864–1865: Alfred Wills
1866–1868: Leslie Stephen
1869–1871: William Mathews
1872–1874: William Longman
1875–1877: Thomas Woodbine Hinchliff
1878–1880: Charles Matthews
1881–1883: Thomas George Bonney
1884–1886: Florence Crauford Grove
1887–1889: Clinton Thomas Dent
1890–1892: Horace Walker
1893–1895: Douglas Freshfield
1896–1898: Charles Pilkington
1899–1901: Dr James Bryce (later Viscount Bryce)
1902–1904: Sir Martin Conway (later Lord Conway of Allington)
1905–1907: George Forrest Browne, Bishop of Bristol
1908–1910: Hermann Wooley
1911–1913: W. E. Davison
1914–1916: William Pickford
1917–1919: John Percy Farrar
1920–1922: J. Norman Collie
1923–1925: Charles Granville Bruce
1926–1928: Sir George Henry Morse
1929–1931: Claude Wilson
1932–1934: Sir John Withers
1935–1937: Edward Lisle Strutt
1938–1940: Sir Claud Schuster GCB (later Lord Schuster)
1941–1943: Geoffrey Winthrop Young
1944–1946: Leo Amery
1947–1949: Tom George Longstaff
1950–1952: Claude Aurelius Elliott
1953–1955: Edwin Savory Herbert
1956–1958: Sir John Hunt (later Lord Hunt)
1959–1961: George Finch
1962–1964: Howard Somervell
1965–1967: Eric Shipton
1968–1970: Charles Evans
1971–1973: A. D. M. Cox
1974–1976: John "Jack" Longland
1977–1979: Peter Lloyd
1980–1982: J. H. Emlyn Jones
1983–1985: R. R. E. Chorley 
1986: A. K. Rawlinson (died in office) 
1986: Lady Denise Evans
1987–1989: George Band
1990–1992: Lieutenant Colonel H. R. A. Streather 'Tony Streather'
1993–1995: Mike Westmacott
1996–1998: Sir Chris Bonington
1999–2001: Doug Scott
2002–2004: Alan Blackshaw
2005–2007: Stephen Venables
2008–2010: Paul Braithwaite
2011–2013: Mick Fowler
2014–2016: Lindsay Griffin
2017–2019: John Porter
2020–: Victor Saunders

Premises
The club's first premises were at 8 St Martin's Place, Trafalgar Square, where it rented rooms in 1858. In 1895 the club moved to 23 Savile Row, and in June 1907, the Scottish artist Sholto Johnstone Douglas held an exhibition of his portraits at the Club.

From 1937 to 1990 the club was based at 74, South Audley Street, in Mayfair, London. In 1936–1937, the surveying firm of Pilditch, Chadwick and Company had converted the ground floor of the building into suitable premises for the club. The club's library was at the back of the building, in what was once the picture gallery of Sir William Cuthbert Quilter. In 1990 the club sold its lease of 74, South Audley Street and briefly shared quarters with the Ski Club of Great Britain at 118, Eaton Square.

In 1991, the Alpine Club acquired the freehold of a five-storey Victorian warehouse at 55, Charlotte Road, on the edge of the City of London, and this building remains its current headquarters. The club's lecture room, bunk-house, library, and archives are all housed there.

References

External links
Official website
A fully digitized 1864 sketchbook from an Alpine Club voyage to Switzerland and Tyrol

 
1857 establishments in the United Kingdom
Sports clubs established in 1857
Alpine clubs
Climbing organizations
Gentlemen's clubs in London
Mountaineering in the Alps
Mountaineering in the United Kingdom